Sugar Daddy Live is a live album by the Melvins, released on May 31, 2011. The songs are taken from their 2008 tour, with the majority of the tracks coming from their two most recent studio albums at the time, (A) Senile Animal and Nude with Boots.

Two songs from the same show that were left off of the live album were released separately. "Suicide in Progress" was released in a split 7-inch with Totimoshi on Volcom Entertainment. "Billy Fish" was released as "Billy Fish Alive" as part of the Joyful Noise 2013 flexi series.

Track listing

Split Series
All thirteen songs were released as 12-inch singles for a split series through Amphetamine Reptile Records with bands selected by the Melvins, taking nearly three years to finish. Though some of the bands submitted new material, others like The U-Men and the Cows contributed previously released material due to being defunct.

Vol. 1: U-Men
"Gila" was originally released on the U-Men's self-titled debut EP in 1984.

Vol. 2: Cows
"Chow" is from the Cows' second album, Daddy Has a Tail, released on AmRep in 1989.

Vol. 3: Off!
Off! provided a cover of "No Reason to Complain", originally by The Alarm Clocks.

Vol. 4: Killdozer
"Lupus" was released in 1989 on Killdozer's Twelve Point Buck album and as a single.

Vol. 5: Midwest Hardcore
A trio of classic hardcore bands from the midwest United States: Negative Approach with "Sick of Talk", Die Kreuzen with "In School" and Necros with "IQ32".

Vol. 6: Butthole Surfers
All Butthole Surfers tracks are taken from a live performance dated January 31, 1987. "No Rule" is a Leather Nun cover.

Vol. 7: Mudhoney
All Mudhoney tracks are taken from a single live performance.

Vol. 8: Fucked Up
"21st Century Cling-Ons" by Fucked Up was released exclusively on this single.

Vol. 9: Napalm Death
"To Go Off and Things" is originally by the Cardiacs. "Oxygen of Duplicity" is a previously unreleased original.

Vol. 10: Fantômas
The Fantômas tracks are taken from the original demo that Mike Patton made before the band was fully assembled. It was released in its entirety on a cassette included in the Wunderkammer box set.

Vol. 11: Melvins 1983
"Dogs and Cattle Prods" was previously released on Tres Cabrones in 2013.

Vol. 12: King Buzzo
"The Vulgar Joke" was originally released on This Machine Kills Artists in 2014 and was the only song left out of the three volume 10-inch vinyl release of the album through AmRep.

Vol. 13: Karp
"Rowdy" came from Karp's last single, released in 1998, and was later included on Action Chemistry. "Bacon Industry" comes from the band's final album, Self Titled LP, originally released in 1997.

Personnel
King Buzzo - guitar, vocals
Dale Crover - drums, vocals
Coady Willis - drums, vocals
Mr. Warren - bass, vocals

Additional personnel
Toshi Kasai - engineer
John Golden - mastering
Mackie Osborne - package design, illustrations
Ben Clark - live photos
Jane Adams - live photos

References

Melvins live albums
2011 live albums
Ipecac Recordings live albums
Amphetamine Reptile Records live albums